The 2018 Texas Southern Tigers football team represents Texas Southern University in the 2018 NCAA Division I FCS football season. The Tigers are led by third-year head coach Michael Haywood and play their home games at a BBVA Compass Stadium in Houston, Texas as members of the West Division of the Southwestern Athletic Conference (SWAC).

Previous season
The Tigers finished the 2017 season 2–9, 2–5 in SWAC play to finish in fourth place in the West Division.

Preseason

SWAC football media day
During the SWAC football media day held in Birmingham, Alabama on July 13, 2018, the Tigers were predicted to finish fourth in the West Division.

Media poll

Presason All-SWAC Team
The Tigers had one player selected to Preseason All-SWAC Teams.

Offense
2nd team

Jimmy White – So. OL

Schedule

Despite also being a member of the SWAC, the game vs Alcorn State will be considered a non conference game and will have no effect on the SWAC standings.

Game summaries

UT–Permian Basin

at Texas State

at Alcorn State

at Houston

Alabama A&M

Grambling State

vs Southern

Mississippi Valley State

at Alabama State

Arkansas–Pine Bluff

at Prairie View A&M

References

Texas Southern
Texas Southern Tigers football seasons
Texas Southern Tigers football